Hugh Miller (born 1859, date of death unknown) was a United States Navy sailor and a recipient of the United States military's highest decoration, the Medal of Honor.

Biography
Born in 1859 in Philadelphia, Pennsylvania, Miller joined the Navy from that state. On that morning, while Quinnebaug was at Alexandria, Egypt, he and another sailor, Seaman Apprentice Second Class August Chandron, jumped overboard and rescued Ordinary Seaman William Evans from drowning. For this action, both Miller and Chandron were awarded the Medal of Honor.

Miller's official Medal of Honor citation reads:
For jumping overboard from the U.S.S. Quinnebaug, at Alexandria, Egypt, on the morning of 21 November 1885 and assisting in saving a shipmate from drowning.

See also

List of Medal of Honor recipients during peacetime

References

External links

1859 births
Year of death missing
Military personnel from Philadelphia
United States Navy sailors
United States Navy Medal of Honor recipients
Non-combat recipients of the Medal of Honor